The National Assembly of the Republic of Korea, often shortened to the National Assembly in domestic English-language media, is the unicameral national legislature of South Korea. Elections to the National Assembly are held every four years. The latest legislative elections were held on 15 April 2020. The National Assembly has 300 seats, with 253 constituency seats and 47 proportional representation seats; 30 of the PR seats are assigned on additional member system, while 17 PR seats use the parallel voting method.

The unicameral assembly consists of at least 200 members according to the South Korean constitution. In 1990 the assembly had 299 seats, 224 of which were directly elected from single-member districts in the general elections of April 1988. Under applicable laws, the remaining seventy-five representatives were elected from party lists. By law, candidates for election to the assembly must be at least thirty years of age. As part of a political compromise in 1987, an earlier requirement that candidates have at least five years' continuous residency in the country was dropped to allow Kim Dae-jung, who had spent several years in exile in Japan and the United States during the 1980s, to return to political life. The National Assembly's term is four years. In a change from the more authoritarian Fourth Republic and Fifth Republic (1972–80 and 1980–87, respectively), under the Sixth Republic, the assembly cannot be dissolved by the president.

Current composition

Structure and appointment

Speaker
The constitution stipulates that the assembly is presided over by a Speaker and two Deputy Speakers, who are responsible for expediting the legislative process. The Speaker and Deputy Speakers are elected in a secret ballot by the members of the Assembly, and their term in office is restricted to two years. The Speaker is independent of party affiliation, and the Speaker and Deputy Speakers may not simultaneously be government ministers.

Negotiation groups
Parties that hold at least 20 seats in the assembly form floor negotiation groups (Hanja: 交涉團體,), which are entitled to a variety of rights that are denied to smaller parties. These include a greater amount of state funding and participation in the leaders' summits that determine the assembly's legislative agenda.

In order to meet the quorum, the United Liberal Democrats, who then held 17 seats, arranged to "rent" three legislators from the Millennium Democratic Party. The legislators returned to the MDP after the collapse of the ULD-MDP coalition in September 2001.

Legislative process

To introduce a bill, a legislator must present the initiative to the Speaker with the signatures of at least ten other members of the assembly. The bill must then be edited by a committee to ensure that the bill contains correct and systematic language. It can then be approved or rejected by the Assembly.

Committees 
There are 17 standing committees which examine bills and petitions falling under their respective jurisdictions, and perform other duties as prescribed by relevant laws.

 House Steering Committee
 Legislation and Judiciary Committee
 National Policy Committee
 Strategy and Finance Committee
 Science, ICT, Future Planning, Broadcasting and Communications Committee
 Education Committee
 Culture, Sports and Tourism Committee
 Foreign Affairs and Unification Committee
 National Defense Committee
 Security and Public Administration Committee
 Agriculture, Food, Rural Affairs, Oceans and Fisheries Committee
 Trade, Industry and Energy Committee
 Health and Welfare Committee
 Environment and Labor Committee
 Land, Infrastructure and Transport Committee
 Intelligence Committee
 Gender Equality and Family Committee

Election

The National Assembly has 300 seats, with 253 constituency seats under FPTP and 47 proportional representation seats. With electoral reform taken in 2019, the PR seats apportionment method was replaced by a variation of additional member system from previous parallel voting system, although 17 seats were temporarily assigned under parallel voting in the 2020 South Korean legislative election.

As per Article 189 of Public Official Election Act, the PR seats are awarded to parties that have either obtained at least 3% of the total valid votes in the legislative election or at least 5 constituency seats. The number of seats allocated to each eligible party are decided by following formula:

where 

  = total number of seats in the National Assembly.
  = number of seats obtained by ineligible parties and independents.
  = number of constituency seats obtained by the party.
  = total number of seats allocated for additional member system.

If the integer is less than 1, then  is set to 0 and the party does not get any seats. Then the sum of initially allocated seats are compared to total seats for additional member system, and recalculated.

Final seats are assigned through the largest remainder method, and if the remainder is equal, the winner is determined by lottery among the relevant political parties.

The voting age was also lowered from 19 to 18 years old, expanding the electorate by over half a million voters.

Legislative violence
From 2004 to 2009, the assembly gained notoriety as a frequent site for legislative violence. The Assembly first came to the world's attention during a violent dispute on impeachment proceedings for then President Roh Moo-hyun, when open physical combat took place in the assembly. Since then, it has been interrupted by periodic conflagrations, piquing the world's curiosity once again in 2009 when members battled each other with sledgehammers and fire extinguishers. The National Assembly since then have preventive measures to prevent any more legislative violence.

History

First Republic

Elections for the assembly were held under UN supervision on 10 May 1948. The First Republic of Korea was established on 17 July 1948 when the constitution of the First Republic was established by the Assembly. The Assembly also had the job of electing the president and elected anti-communist Syngman Rhee as president on 10 May 1948.

Under the first constitution, the National Assembly was unicameral. Under the second and third constitutions, the National Assembly was to be bicameral and consist of the House of Representatives and the House of Councillors, but in practice the legislature was unicameral because the House of Representatives was prevented from passing the law necessary to establish the House of Councillors.

Second Republic

Third Republic

Since the reopening of the National Assembly in 1963 until today, it has been unicameral.

Fourth Republic

Fifth Republic

Sixth Republic

Members
List of members of the South Korean Constituent Assembly
List of members of the National Assembly (South Korea), 1950–1954
List of members of the National Assembly (South Korea), 1954–1958
List of members of the National Assembly (South Korea), 1981–1985
List of members of the National Assembly (South Korea), 1985–1988
List of members of the National Assembly (South Korea), 1988–1992
List of members of the National Assembly (South Korea), 1992–1996
List of members of the National Assembly (South Korea), 1996–2000
List of members of the National Assembly (South Korea), 2000–2004
List of members of the National Assembly (South Korea), 2004–2008
List of members of the National Assembly (South Korea), 2008–2012
List of members of the National Assembly (South Korea), 2012–2016
List of members of the National Assembly (South Korea), 2016–2020
List of members of the National Assembly (South Korea), 2020–2024

Gallery

See also
List of political parties in South Korea
Politics of South Korea
National Assembly TV
Supreme People's Assembly, the North Korean legislature
2019 South Korean Capitol attack

References

U.S. Library of Congress Country Studies

 
Korea, South
Government of South Korea
South Korea